Romana Rotterová (born 17 October 1931 in Prague) is a Czech printmaker, sculptor, textile artist, illustrator, and poet.

Romana Rotterová is child of the sculptor Leonard Rotter and his wife Julie, with whom she initially studied sculpture. Poor health lead her to pursue a career in printmaking instead. She is especially known for her work in intaglio and drypoint. Two of Rotterová's prints are owned by the National Gallery of Art. Two more are in the collection of the Smart Museum of Art.

Life and education 
Romana Rotterová was born on 17 October 1931 in Prague, as the only child of the sculptor Leonard Rotter and his wife Julie. As a child, she had spent a lot of time with her father in his atelier in Malá Strana, where she observed his work, learned the base of visual art, and later on studied sculpture. Romana Rotterová has also learned from the Vienna-born Czech sculptor Mary Duras. While working as a commercial artist in her late teens and early twenties, she met , who introduced her to the art of printmaking and she has created her first prints in his studio.

Work 
At the beginning of her work, Romana Rotterová devoted herself to drawing, smaller sculptural formats (terracotta plaquettes), commercial art, illustrations of prose and poetry collections, and scientific illustration. 

After 1963, she focused on printmaking, using black and white etching, intaglio, and dry point techniques in a combination with structural graphics. Similar to sculptural work, a graphic sheet is often preceded by a preparatory drawing. By gradually wiping the color from the matrix during printing, plasticity and contrast are achieved, similar to removing clay when modeling a sculpture. Larger formats and demanding techniques allow the production of only a few prints, which have the character of a monotype. Color is used sparingly to create bold accents.

The graphic work from the mid-1960s still reflects the creative impulses of the informal in the emphasis on surface structures and interprets real landscapes or their material elements in the form of simplified symbols (Blue Cloud 1966). Figurative motifs are usually only in form of a hint (Closing 1966), frequent inspiration is music (The Sound of the Flute 1965, Harp 1987) and ancient Greece (Karyatida 1972, Dream of Greece-Olymp 1972).

Gradually, the element of individual experience, existential anxiety (Closure 1966) and borderline situations in interpersonal relationships (Relationships III 1970) are emphasized more, everything superfluous disappears from the surface. Reality is replaced by artistic signs, the effect is achieved by creating tension between reduced shapes, depth and density of lines and contrasts of bright surfaces and shadows. The names of the graphic sheets also correspond to this – from primal reflections of the real world using color accents (Old sun 1965, Little red crate 1968) to abstract feelings expressed only by contrasts of black and white (Hesitation 1968, Concentration 1968).

In the 1990s, the degree of abstraction was perfected, the maximum effect was achieved with the use of meditative symbols and subtle values (Paths of Light 1990, Little Silence 1991), the subject of the depiction became a landscape of inner experiences (Landscape reading 1993, Landscape concert 1993).

Collections 
 National Gallery Prague
 Museum of Modern Art, New York
 National Gallery of Art, Washington 
 Museum of Contemporary Art, Los Angeles 
 National Museum of Women in the Arts, Washington D.C.
 Museum Jan Heestershuis, Schijndel, Netherlands
 The Regional Gallery of Fine Arts, Zlín
 Olomouc Museum of Art 
 Regional Gallery in Jihlava
 The Gallery of Visual Art in Hodonín
 Private collections home and abroad

Awards 
 1976 Woman in contemporary art, Hollar, Prague
 1993 Award for Non-traditional Graphical Expression, Inter-Kontakt-Grafik, Prague
 2003 Grafix 2003, Small prints Biennale, Břeclav

Exhibitions

Solo 
 1967 Expo 1967, Montreal
 1968 Prints, Gallery D, Portheimka, Prague
 1987 Prints, Theater of music, Olomouc
 1990 Romana Rotterová - prints, Jana Čubrdová - ceramic sculptures, OGVU Náchod
 1990 Prints, Monastery Opařany
 1991 Romana Rotterová - Processes and journeys (prints), Institute of macromolecular chemistry ČSAV, Prague
 1992 Prints, Kassel
 1992/93 Romana Rotterová - prints, textile, Ars viva, Umělecký klub, Prague
 1993 Romana Rotterová a Jaroslav Synek - prints and objects, Gallery Hertolt, Strakonice
 1993 Romana Rotterová - prints, drawings, MK, Artotéka Opatov, Prague
 1993 Romana Rotterová - prints, aradekor, Ars viva, Future, Prague
 2004 Romana Rotterová - prints, work selection, Pastoral center of Saint Thomas, Dobříš
 2006 Meeting: Inge Kosková, drawings - Romana Rotterová, prints, Gallery Šternberk
 2007 Romana Rotterová - Little Silence (prints from years 1960-90), KP Školská, Prague
 2011 Metamorfózy (retrospective exhibition of prints), KD Dobříš
 2011 Romana Rotterová - Records (drawings), Pastoral center of Saint Thomas, Dobříš
 2013 Romana Rotterová - prints, tapestry, Gallery of Fine Arts in Náchod 
 2014 Romana Rotterová - Concentration, Gallery of Josip Plečnik, Prague
 2016 Romana Rotterová - Journey, Horácká Gallery in Nové Město na Moravě

Collective (selected) 
 1966 AICA, Moravian Gallery, Brno; Youth Illustrations, Gallery Fronta, Prague
 1967 Czechoslovakian prints, Kiel, Hamburg; 1. Salon, Czechoslovak Pavilion, Prague; Internationale Graphik, Gallery Arctica, Cuxhaven
 1968 Czechoslovakian prints, Brussels, Munich, Hamburg, New York, Montreal; Nine women printmakers, Gallery D, Prague, MG Písek; 1. Biennale – prints research, Jihlava
 1969 2. Salon, Hybernia Theatre, Prague; Czechoslovakian prints, Berlin, Toronto, Brussels, Hamburg, Oregon; Touring print exhibition, Netherlands, Switzerland
 1970 Czechoslovakian prints, EXIMA, Munich; Expo 1969, Osaka
 1971 Book Fair, Frankfurt
 1976 Woman in contemporary art, Hollar, Prague
 1979 Czechoslovakian prints, Helsinki, Tampere, Turku
 1988 Salon of Prague visual artists, Czechoslovak Pavilion, Prague
 1989 Contemporary Czech prints, Mánes, Prague; Tapestry exhibition, Gallery Klenová; Salon of commercial art, Czechoslovak Pavilion, Prague
 1990 SČG František Kupka, Musaion, Prague; Czech Alternative, ÚLUV, Prague; Symbol of the Freedom of Czechoslovakia, BKH Fine Art Gallery, Los Angeles
 1991 SČG František Kupka, member exhibition, Gallery Chodov, Prague; Prints trienale „Prague Graphic 91“, Gallery Modrý pavilon, Prague
 1992 Experimental prints from Bohemia, Berlin
 1993 Meditative prints from Bohemia, Graz; Trienale of European prints, Interkontakt 93, Prague
 1994 Prints biennale, Gallery Chagal, Ostrava
 1995 Laureates of Trienale and Prints of the year, Central-european gallery, Prague
 1996 Temple Bar International Prints , Dublin
 1997 Print of the year, The Old Town Hall, Prague
 2005 The places of memory, Gallery Šternberk
 2006/7 Focused vies (60s prints), Regional Gallery in Liberec; Regional Gallery in Jihlava
 2007 Hluboká tajemnost Tao, Small gallery of Česká spořitelna, Kladno; Gallery Pod věží, Třeboň
 2007 Lidice Memorial
 2008 Corpus delicti, GVU Havlíčkův Brod
 2009 Hluboká tajemnost Tao, Gallery Pod věží, Třeboň

Bibliography 
 Romana Rotterová, catalogue of authors, Borovička J, 1968, SČVU Prague
 Romana Rotterová, catalogue of authors, Kapusta J, 1987, Divadlo hudby, Olomouc
 Obrazová encyklopedie české grafiky 80. let , 1993, Hošková-Vomočilová S, Schleppe S, ed., SGN Prague, 255 p., 
 Soustředěný pohled /Focussed view (grafika 60. let…), 2007, Drury R a kol., Rada galerií ČR, Prague, 179 p., 
 Romana Rotterová, catalogue, Lomová O, Jirousová V, 2008, Gallery Lidice
 Romana Rotterová, catalogue of authors, not dated, V. Jirousová
 Romana Rotterová, Pocta dokonalým, 162 p., 2010, Centrum Spirála, 
 Romana Rotterová, catalogue of authors, 100 p., Kapusta J. st., Kapusta J, 2013, GVU Náchod,

Illustrations 
 Epos o Gilgamešovi, 1971, Mladá fronta, Prague
 Hvězdy na nebi, lidé na zemi, 1974, Máj, Prague
 Jiří Orten: Osud , 2006, Odeon,

References

1931 births
Living people
Czech printmakers
Women printmakers
20th-century Czech artists
20th-century printmakers
20th-century Czech women artists
21st-century Czech artists
21st-century printmakers
21st-century Czech women artists
Artists from Prague